Tadhg Haran (born 6 September 1991) is an Irish hurler who currently plays as a midfielder for Liam Mellows and the Galway senior hurling team.

Haran made his first appearance for the senior team during the 2012 championship and immediately became a regular impact sub.  An All-Ireland medalist in the minor and under-21 grades, Haran has won one Leinster medal in the senior grade.

At club level Haran plays with the Liam Mellows club.

In August 2017 Tadhg won the All-Ireland Poc Fada Championship.

References

1991 births
Living people
People from Galway (city)
Liam Mellows hurlers
Galway inter-county hurlers
Salthill-Knocknacarra Gaelic footballers